Wilfred Beckford (1909 – July 1959) was a Jamaican cricketer. He played in nine first-class matches for the Jamaican cricket team from 1926 and 1936.

See also
 List of Jamaican representative cricketers

References

External links
 

1909 births
1959 deaths
Jamaican cricketers
Jamaica cricketers
Place of birth missing